The Branch Banking Company Building is a historic bank building located in Wilson, North Carolina.  It was built by the Branch Banking and Trust Company in 1903, and is a two-story, rectangular, blond brick building in the Classical Revival / Renaissance Revival style. A three bay extension was built in 1934.  It features reddish sandstone detailing such as the window surrounds, pediment, columns and capitals; and an overhanging pressed metal cornice. It was listed on the National Register of Historic Places in 1978. It is located in the Wilson Central Business-Tobacco Warehouse Historic District.

The building is now the headquarters of the Arts Council of Wilson.

References

External links

Bank buildings on the National Register of Historic Places in North Carolina
Renaissance Revival architecture in North Carolina
Neoclassical architecture in North Carolina
Buildings and structures in Wilson County, North Carolina
National Register of Historic Places in Wilson County, North Carolina
Historic district contributing properties in North Carolina